Waltz Again is an album by David Murray released on the Canadian Justin Time label. Recorded in 2002 and released in 2005 the album features performances by Murray, Lafayette Gilchrist, Jaribu Shahid, and Hamid Drake along with a 10-person string section.

Reception
The Allmusic review by Alex Henderson awarded the album 4 stars stating "Waltz Again has its share of avant-garde appeal, but some parts of this 63-minute CD are peaceful, tranquil, and downright comforting -- even lush on occasion. And lush is certainly doable when you have ten string players on hand. There are many worthwhile albums in Murray's sizable catalog, and Waltz Again is likely to go down in history as one of his strongest recordings of the 2000s".

Track listing
All compositions by David Murray 
 "Pushkin Suite No. 1" -  26:04  
 "Waltz Again" - 8:51  
 "Dark Secrets" - 10:17  
 "Steps" - 11:23  
 "Sparkle" - 6:41   
Recorded December 2002

Personnel
David Murray - tenor saxophone, bass clarinet
Lafayette Gilchrist - piano
Jaribu Shahid - bass
Hamid Drake - drums
Unidentified string section

References

2005 albums
David Murray (saxophonist) albums
Justin Time Records albums